Hermann Max Pechstein (31 December 1881 – 29 June 1955) was a German expressionist painter and printmaker and a member of the Die Brücke group. He fought on the Western Front during World War I and his art was classified as Degenerate Art by the Nazis. More than 300 paintings were removed from German Museums during the Nazi era.

Life and career
Pechstein was born in Zwickau, the son of a craftsman who worked in a textile mill. The family of eight lived on the father's salary. An early contact with the art of Vincent van Gogh stimulated Pechstein's development toward expressionism. He first worked as a decorator in his home town before enrolling at the School of Applied Arts and then at the Royal Art Academy in Dresden, where he met the painter Otto Gussman and the architect Wilhelm Kreis. It was here, starting in 1902, that he became a pupil of Gussmann; a relationship that lasted until 1906 when Pechstein met Erich Heckel and was invited to join the art group Die Brücke. He was the only member to have received formal art training. He was an active member of the Brücke until 1910 and often worked alongside Brücke painters creating a homogeneous style of this period. In 1905 he was in Dresden where the museum of ethnology showed wood carvings from the South Seas. As a result he developed his first woodcut.

In 1907 Pechstein traveled to Italy to receive an award, and upon his return in 1908 spent time in Paris where he met the Fauvist painter Kees van Dongen whom he persuaded to join Die Brücke. Later that year Pechstein moved to Berlin (a move that fellow painters were to make in the following three years). After being categorically rejected from exhibiting in the Berlin Secession in 1910, he helped to found and became chairman of the New Secession and gained recognition for his decorative and colorful prints that were inspired by the art of Van Gogh, Matisse, and the Fauves.

In 1912, after years of rising tensions, Pechstein was expelled from the Brücke after exhibiting some of his work in the aforementioned Berlin Secession all by himself and without paintings of other members of the Brücke. This expulsion was a relatively happy one as Pechstein had been receiving rewards and recognition far beyond his peers owing to his conservative style that appealed to a wider audience. This recognition only distanced him from the group and bred animosity among the members. His paintings eventually became more primitivist, incorporating thick black lines and angular figures. Looking for inspiration, he traveled to Palau in the Pacific ocean. Upon the outbreak of World War I, Pechstein was interned in Japan and returned to Germany via Shanghai, Manila, and New York. He was sent to fight on the Western Front (World War I) in 1916. Despite his notably conservative stance and style, after the German Revolution of 1918–19, Pechstein joined two radical socialist groups: the Arbeitsrat für Kunst and the November Group (German). Beginning in 1922, Pechstein became a professor at the Berlin Academy.

Beginning in 1933, Pechstein was vilified by the Nazis because of his art. He was banned from painting or exhibiting his art and later that year was fired from his teaching position. A total of 326 of his paintings were removed from German museums. Sixteen of his works were displayed in the Entartete Kunst (Degenerate Art) exhibition of 1937. During this time, Pechstein went into seclusion in rural Pomerania. He was reinstated in 1945, and subsequently won numerous titles and awards for his work.

Many of Pechstein's collectors were Jews whose collections were seized by the Nazis or lost owing to Nazi persecution. In May 2013 the Bavarian State Paintings Collections agreed to restitute Pechstein's White House, (1910) and his Meadow Valley (1911) to the heirs of Curt Glaser. In July 2021, France decided to restitute to the heirs of Hugo Simon the Pechstein entitled Nus dans un paysage.

He was a prolific printmaker, producing 421 lithographs, 315 woodcuts and linocuts, and 165 intaglio prints, mostly etchings.

Personal life 
He was married to Charlotte Karpolat from 1911 until 1923 and later was married to Marta Möller. He died in West Berlin and is buried in the Evangelischer Friedhof Alt-Schmargendorf in Berlin.

Works

Art market
At a 1999 Sotheby's auction, The Yellow Mask I (1910), the portrait of a woman wearing a yellow mask, was sold for $1.37 million. In 2008, Zirkus mit Dromedaren (c. 1920) was auctioned for £1.9 million in London.

References

External links 

 
 Max Pechstein at Artcyclopedia
 Official Max Pechstein Webpage/Catalogue raisonne of Pechstein's oil paintings
 Hermann Max Pechstein (1881 - 1955) Biography at Galerie Ludorff, Düsseldorf, Germany

1881 births
1955 deaths
People from Zwickau
People from the Kingdom of Saxony
20th-century German painters
20th-century German male artists
German male painters
Modern painters
German Expressionist painters
Commanders Crosses of the Order of Merit of the Federal Republic of Germany
Academic staff of the Prussian Academy of Arts
20th-century German printmakers